Timothy William Bright (born July 28, 1960) is a retired American decathlete and pole vaulter.

Born in Taft, California, Bright represented the US in the decathlon at the 1984 and 1988 Olympics and the 1987 World Championships, and in the pole vault at the 1985 World University Games, the 1985 World Cup, the 1991 World Championships and the 1992 Olympics. He won the American national championships in decathlon in 1987. His personal best score was 8340 points, achieved in June 1987 in San Jose.  At one point he held the Decathlon World Record for the Pole Vault, set during the 1988 Olympics.

He also became American champion in pole vault in 1991 and 1992. His personal best jump was 5.87 metres, achieved in July 1990 in Nice.

Coaching career

Former assistant coach for Concordia University (Oregon) and assistant coach at Lewis & Clark College in men's pole vault. Tim is now the pole vault coach at Oregon State University.

Achievements

References
 
 

1960 births
Living people
American male pole vaulters
American male decathletes
Athletes (track and field) at the 1984 Summer Olympics
Athletes (track and field) at the 1988 Summer Olympics
Athletes (track and field) at the 1992 Summer Olympics
Olympic track and field athletes of the United States
Track and field athletes from California
Place of birth missing (living people)
Concordia University (Oregon)
People from Taft, California
World record holders in masters athletics
Goodwill Games medalists in athletics
Competitors at the 1990 Goodwill Games